The East of England Agricultural Society is an agricultural society in the east of England. The Society which is a registered charity owns the land known as the East of England Showground in Peterborough, England.

History
The Society was formed in 1970 by the merger of the Cambridgeshire and Isle of Ely (established 1863), Huntingdonshire (established 1837) and Peterborough (established 1797) agricultural societies. It was joined by the Bedfordshire Agricultural Society (1801) in 1971 and the Northamptonshire Agricultural Society (1848) in 1972. The Long Sutton Agricultural Society (1837) in neighbouring Lincolnshire remains independent and is affiliated for show purposes only.

The first president of the Peterborough Agricultural Society, the 4th Earl Fitzwilliam was elected in 1797. The annual subscription was one guinea  and that amount remained until 1950.

Until 2012, it was the organiser of the East of England Show held each year at the 250 acre (101 ha) East of England Showground at Alwalton, five miles (8 km) west of the city of Peterborough in Cambridgeshire.

References

Organizations established in 1970
1970 establishments in England
Agricultural organisations based in England
Agricultural shows in England
Organisations based in Peterborough
Agricultural Society